Callerya bonatiana is a species of flowering plant in the family Fabaceae, native to south-central and southeastern mainland China, Laos and Vietnam. It was first described in 1910 as Millettia bonatiana.

Taxonomy
Callerya bonatiana was first described by Renato Pampanini  in 1910 as Millettia bonatiana. A 2019 molecular phylogenetic study found it to be the first diverging member of a narrowly circumscribed genus Callerya, and so placed in that genus. A 2021 study obtained different results using chloroplast DNA (cpDNA) and nuclear ribosomal DNA (nrDNA). The cpDNA results agreed with the 2019 study where Callerya bonatiana was sister to the rest of the genus Callerya; the nrDNA results placed Callerya bonatiana as sister to a larger clade, including Kanburia, Whitfordiodendron and Afgekia sericea. The left hand cladogram shows the tree using cpDNA, the right hand one the tree using nrDNA (with other genera omitted in both trees).

Given the position of Callerya bonatiana in the nrDNA tree, a new genus, Villosocallerya was established, and Callerya bonatiana treated as Villosocallerya bonatiana. , Villosocallerya was not recognized by Plants of the World Online.

References

Wisterieae
Flora of South-Central China
Flora of Southeast China
Flora of Laos
Flora of Vietnam
Plants described in 1910